Juan Alfredo Farías (born 8 May 1945) is a Bolivian footballer. He played in two matches for the Bolivia national football team in 1975. He was also part of Bolivia's squad for the 1975 Copa América tournament.

References

External links
 

1945 births
Living people
Bolivian footballers
Bolivia international footballers
Place of birth missing (living people)
Association football forwards
The Strongest players
Bolivian football managers
The Strongest managers
Club Real Potosí managers
Club San José managers